Elmer Adelmo Marín Arriola (born October 14, 1979 in Sonaguera) is a Honduran footballer]who currently is retired.

Club career
Marín enjoyed a couple of seasons at Olimpia before moving to Real España in 2005. He left them in January 2007 for Atlético Olanchano.

In summer 2012, Marín joined second division UPNFM.

In 2005, he was the first player to be physically hurt by barras bravas during a match between Olimpia and Real Espana, when a huge bolt was thrown to his head.

International career
Marín played at the 1999 FIFA World Youth Championship.

He made his senior debut for Honduras in a May 2000 friendly match against Canada and has earned a total of 13 caps, scoring no goals. He has represented his country in 2 FIFA World Cup qualification matches.

His final international was a February 2006 friendly match against China.

References

External links

1979 births
Living people
People from Colón Department (Honduras)
Association football midfielders
Honduran footballers
Honduras international footballers
C.D. Olimpia players
Real C.D. España players
Atlético Olanchano players
Deportes Savio players
C.D.S. Vida players
Lobos UPNFM players
Liga Nacional de Fútbol Profesional de Honduras players